The Chang Lien-cheng Saxophone Museum is a saxophone museum and manufacturing company in Houli District, Taichung, Taiwan.

History
The museum is named after Chang Lien-cheng, a local resident who made the first saxophone in Taiwan on his own. His effort initiated the development of saxophone industries in Taiwan ever since, which is now one of the largest centers of saxophone production in the world. The Chang Lien-cheng Saxophone Museum was then opened on 27 January 2011 by Chang's grandchildren.

Architecture
The museum was built as a memorial hall previously dedicated to Chang. It is a two-story building with a concert hall and a tourist-friendly factory that allows visitors to see how the instruments are made.

Transportation
The museum is accessible west from Houli Station of the Taiwan Railways.

See also
 List of museums in Taiwan
 List of music museums

References

External links
 

2011 establishments in Taiwan
Biographical museums in Taiwan
Industry museums in Taiwan
Museums established in 2011
Musical instrument museums
Museums in Taichung
Music organizations based in Taiwan
Saxophones